The 18th Panzer Division was a German World War II armoured division that fought on the Eastern Front from 1941 until its disbandment in 1943.

Formation 
The 18th Panzer Division was formed on 26 October 1940 at Chemnitz from parts of the 4th Infantry Division, 14th Infantry Division, and four battalions of submersible tanks. They had originally been intended for Operation Sea Lion (Seelöwe), the planned German invasion of United Kingdom. Of these four tank battalions, two formed the 18th Panzer Regiment and the other two the 28th Panzer Regiment of the 18th Panzer Division. In March 1941 the 18th Panzer Division was reorganized, the 28th Panzer Regiment was disbanded, one of its battalions became the third battalion of the 18th Panzer Regiment, the other battalion was transferred to the 3rd Panzer Division.

Service
The 18th Panzer Division first saw action during the German invasion of the Soviet Union, Operation Barbarossa, on 22 June 1941. The 18th Panzer Division fought as part of XLVII Panzer Corps, and over the next six months was involved in seizing Smolensk, Bryansk and the assault on Tula. The division suffered heavy losses in the first month of the war, losing half its tanks and a third of its manpower in June and July. With the start of the Soviet counter offensive in December 1941 the 18th Panzer Division was driven back to Oryol with heavy losses.

In the summer of 1942, the 18th Panzer Division took part in the initial drive on Stalingrad, but was soon transferred to the central section of the front. The 18th Panzer Division took part in security warfare in the spring of 1943. In the summer of 1943, the division fought in the Battle of Kursk, and suffered heavy losses. After Kursk the 18th Panzer-Division suffered from poor morale and frequent desertions and was disbanded, with the division's personnel being used to build the 18th Artillery Division.

War crimes
According to Omer Bartov, the 18th Panzer Division was heavily engaged in the looting of food from Soviet civilians to the point that the latter starved to death. At the beginning of the invasion orders were given to execute wounded Soviet soldiers as these were seen as an unnecessary burden. In "bandit-fighting" operations, the division command gave out orders to shoot anybody suspected of supporting alleged partisans. Within the division, harsh measures were employed against any soldier found guilty of dissent or reluctant to fight, leading to a number of executions.

Organization
Organization of the division:

 Headquarters
 18th Panzer Regiment
 52nd Panzergrenadier Regiment
 101st Panzergrenadier Regiment
 88th Panzer Artillery Regiment
 18th Motorcycle Battalion
 88th Panzer Reconnaissance Battalion
 88th Tank Destroyer Battalion
 209th Panzer Engineer Battalion
 88th Panzer Signal Battalion
 88th Panzer Divisional Supply Group

Commanding officers
The commander of the division:
General der Panzertruppen Walther Nehring, 26 October 1940
Generalleutnant Karl Freiherr von Thüngen, 26 January 1942
General der Nachrichtentruppen Albert Praun, July 1942
Generalleutnant Karl Freiherr von Thüngen, 24 August 1942
Generalleutnant Erwin Menny, 15 September 1942
Generalleutnant Karl Freiherr von Thüngen, February 1943
Generalleutnant Karl-Wilhelm von Schlieben, 1 April 1943

References

Bibliography
 Rosado, J. and Bishop, C. German Wehrmacht Panzer Divisions, 1939–45. Amber Books Ltd., 2005
 

1*18
Military units and formations established in 1940
Military units and formations disestablished in 1943